{{Infobox television
| alt_name           = My Unexpected Housemate, Insolent Housemates, Outrageous Roommates
| image              = Living_Together_in_Empty_Room_Poster.jpg
| genre              = Variety show
| starring           = Various artists
| director           = {{plainlist|
Choi Yoon-jeong<ref name="productionteam">{{Cite web|title=Living Together in Empty Rooms production team on MBC official website|url=http://www.imbc.com/broad/tv/ent/livingwith/concept/index.html|work=MBC|accessdate=December 8, 2017|language=ko}}</ref>
Jeon Hwi-je
Jo Doo-yeon
}}
| country            = South Korea
| language           = Korean
| executive_producer = Kim Goo-san
| runtime            = 95 minutes
| picture_format     = 1080i
| company            = MBC
| network            = MBC
| first_aired        = 
| last_aired         = 
| num_episodes       = 33
}}Living Together in Empty Room, also known as My Unexpected Housemate''', is a 2017 South Korean television program starring various artists. After premiering its pilot episodes on January 27 and 28, it officially replaced Duet Song Festival and began to air on MBC on Fridays at 21:50 (KST) starting April 14, 2017. The last episode was broadcast on March 23, 2018.

Format
The program revolves mostly around celebrities who live alone or those that are interested in becoming roommates with other celebrities for a short period of time. The participants house that the roommate(s) temporarily live in becomes the landlord, while the other member(s) are referred to as tenants. Each time there is a new living arrangement, the first order of business is to go over the lease agreement as a group, specifically, the section of the contract where each person lists up to three terms for their time together as roommates. The terms can be rules/guidelines for the roommates to follow, but usually, the terms are activities that each person would like to experience altogether while living as roommates. Once everyone has agreed upon each others terms, the contract is signed by all parties and an acceptable amount for rent is negotiated that the tenant(s) will then pay the landlord before they start living together roommates. They will live together for a few days and carry out the contractual provisions.

At the end, they will sincerely think about the memories with each other after living together, and each of them will separately respond to a survey that they will select "YES" or "NO" to become roommates with each other again; the results are announced shortly thereafter. This survey is only symbolic, and not decisive, i.e. all of them select "YES" doesn't mean that they will be roommates again.

Broadcast timeline

Cast members

Guest appearance

Ratings
In the table below,  represent the lowest ratings and  represent the highest ratings.

2017

Remarks
May 26, 2017: Due to broadcast of 2017 FIFA U-20 World Cup's match between South Korea and England, episode 6 was delayed to broadcast later 30 minutes than usual and in only one part.
June 2, 2017: Episode 7 was broadcast early at 20:55 (KST).
Since episode 16, the program broadcast a continuous episode instead of division into two parts per episode.
September 8 – December 1, 2017: Episode 21 was cancelled due to MBC strike. A special episode, included the highlights of the 1970s trio's part (Oh Hyun-kyung, Kim Gura and Ji Sang-ryeol), was aired instead on September 8.
December 29, 2017: Episode 24 was cancelled due to broadcast of 2017 MBC Entertainment Awards.

2018

Remarks
February 9, 2018: Episode 29 was cancelled due to broadcast of 2018 Winter Olympics.
February 23, 2018: Due to broadcast of 2018 Winter Olympics, episode 30 was late aired at 23:55.
March 9, 2018: Episode 32 was cancelled due to broadcast of 2018 Winter Paralympics opening ceremony.

Awards and nominations

See alsoRoommate''

References

External links
 
 on MBC Global Media

2017 South Korean television series debuts
2018 South Korean television series endings
Korean-language television shows
MBC TV original programming
South Korean variety television shows